Beatrice Peak is a peak located on the Continental Divide on the border of Banff and Kootenay National Parks, between Stanley Peak and Mount Ball. The mountain was named in 1912 by the Alpine Club of Canada after Beatrice Shultz who climbed the mountain that year.

The scrambling route to Mt. Ball includes the ascent of Beatrice Peak.

See also
List of peaks on the British Columbia–Alberta border

References

Three-thousanders of Alberta
Three-thousanders of British Columbia
Canadian Rockies
Great Divide of North America
Borders of Alberta
Borders of British Columbia
Mountains of Banff National Park
Kootenay National Park